The 2020–21 Saint Louis Billikens men's basketball team represented Saint Louis University during the 2020–21 NCAA Division I men's basketball season. Their head coach was Travis Ford in his fifth season at Saint Louis. The team played their home games at Chaifetz Arena as a member of the Atlantic 10 Conference. They finished the season 14-7, 6-4 to finish a tie for 4th place. They defeated UMass in the quarterfinals of the A-10 tournament before losing in the semifinals to St. Bonaventure. They received an invitation to the NIT where they lost in the first round to Mississippi State.

Previous season 
The Billikens finished the 2019-20 season 23–8, 12-6 in A-10 play in fourth place.  Their season ended when the A-10 tournament and all other postseason tournaments were canceled due to the ongoing coronavirus pandemic.

Offseason

Departures

Incoming transfers

2020 recruiting class

Roster 

Source

Schedule 

|-
!colspan=12 style=| Non-conference regular season
|-

|-
!colspan=12 style=| Atlantic 10 regular season
|-

    
                                          
                             

                              

                        
                                    
 
                        

  
|-
!colspan=12 style=| A-10 tournament

|-
!colspan=12 style=| NIT

|-

Rankings

*AP does not release post-NCAA Tournament rankings

References 

Saint Louis
Saint Louis Billikens men's basketball seasons
Saint Louis Billikens men's basketball
Saint Louis Billikens  men's basketball
Saint Louis